Bradypodion barbatulum is a beardless dwarf chameleon endemic to South Africa. Bradypodion (meaning "slow-footed" in Greek) is one of six genera of chameleons that are native to southern Africa, sometimes collectively called South African dwarf chameleons.

References

Bradypodion
Endemic reptiles of South Africa
Reptiles described in 2022